Dinas may refer to:

Places

England

 Dinas, an area of Padstow, Cornwall
 Castle an Dinas, St Columb Major, an Iron Age hillfort at the summit of Castle Downs, Cornwall
 Treryn Dinas, a headland near Treen, on the Penwith peninsula, Cornwall
 Trereen Dinas, an Iron Age promontory fort at Gurnard's Head, Cornwall

Wales 
 Dinas, Gwynedd, a large hamlet near Bontnewydd, Caernarfon
 Dinas railway station, on the narrow gauge Welsh Highland Railway
 Dinas (FR) railway station, disused Festiniog Railway station
 Dinas Cross, a village and community in Pembrokeshire
 Dinas Island, (Ynys Dinas) a peninsula in the community of Dinas Cross
Dinas Dinlle, a small settlement in Gwynedd
Dinas Emrys, a hillock near Beddgelert, Gwynedd
Dinas Mawddwy, a town and community in Gwynedd
 Dinas Powys, a village and community in the Vale of Glamorgan
 Dinas Powys railway station
Dinas Powys hillfort
 Dinas Rhondda, a village near Tonypandy, Rhondda Cynon Taf
 Dinas Rhondda railway station
Castell Dinas, a hillfort and castle in southern Powys
Llyn Dinas, a lake near Beddgelert, Gwynedd
Pen Dinas, a large hill in Penparcau, on the coast of Ceredigion

Philippines 
 Dinas, Zamboanga del Sur, a municipality

People
 Arley Dinas (born 1974), a former Colombian football player
 Thanasis Dinas (born 1989), Greek footballer

Other uses
 Dinas (weevil), a beetle genus in the tribe Sciaphilini

See also